Chalcidoptera thermographa is a moth in the family Crambidae. It was described by George Hampson in 1912. It is found in the former Katanga Province of the Democratic Republic of the Congo, Ethiopia, South Africa and Zambia.

References

Moths described in 1912
Spilomelinae